Tirk Recordings is a UK record label created by Sav Remzi.  It has signed a broad range of sounds from the Kraut Rock of Fujiya & Miyagi, to the disco re-edits from Greg Wilson, the "SoCal" sounds of Daniel Judd (aka "Sorcerer") and the New York 'Disco bump' of Drrtyhaze. Signings include solo works from the Chaz Jankel (Ian Dury's Blockheads) and producer Martin Rushent; also house music acts like Syclops (from producer Maurice Fulton) and Tom Findlay's (Groove Armada) Sugardaddy.

In 2007 a merger with recently formed independent Music Rights Collective provided Tirk with an infrastructure to sign new acts, produce, and market its music.

Artists
 Chaz Jankel
 Fujiya & Miyagi
 Greg Wilson
 Louie Austen
 Martin Rushent
 Pocket
 Sugardaddy

References

External links
 

British record labels